Florence (also Florence Station) is an unincorporated community in Stephenson County, Illinois, United States.

References

Unincorporated communities in Stephenson County, Illinois
Unincorporated communities in Illinois